Richard Lugo may refer to:

 Richard Lugo (basketball) (born 1973), Venezuelan basketball player
 Richard Lugo (footballer) (born 1992), Paraguayan footballer